Pierre Karleskind (born 19 October 1979) is a French oceanographer and politician of La République En Marche! (LREM) who was elected as a Member of the European Parliament in 2019.

Political career
In parliament, Karleskind has since been serving on the Committee on the Internal Market and Consumer Protection and as member of the Committee on Fisheries. In 2020, he became the chairman of the Committee on Fisheries. 

In addition to his committee assignments, Karleskind is a member of the European Parliament Intergroup on LGBT Rights, the European Parliament Intergroup on Climate Change, Biodiversity and Sustainable Development, the European Parliament Intergroup on Seas, Rivers, Islands and Coastal Areas, and the MEPs Against Cancer group.

Political positions
Karleskind mobilised 64 MEPs to officially refer the police’s mass arrest of LGBT activists in Poland to the European Commission.

In a 2022 letter to European Commissioner for the Environment, Oceans and Fisheries Virginijus Sinkevičius, Karleskind – together with Stéphanie Yon-Courtin and Nathalie Loiseau – urged the EU to take measures to end British water treatment facilities’ discharges of raw sewage into shared waters, part of what they argued was an unacceptable lowering of environmental standards since Brexit.

References

1979 births
Living people
MEPs for France 2019–2024
La République En Marche! MEPs
La République En Marche! politicians
École Polytechnique alumni